Kansas Magic was a professional indoor soccer team based in Overland Park, Kansas. They played in the Eastern Division of the Professional Arena Soccer League. The team colors were purple, white and black.

History

The Kansas Magic was awarded a franchise in the PASL on February 10, 2011. Their first game was an exhibition at Landon Arena on April 30, defeating the Illinois Piasa 7-3. They beat the Piasa 11-9 in Illinois in the PASL season opener on November 5 and 4-3 in their first home game at EPIC Indoor Sports on November 12.

They finished the 2011–12 season with a record of 8 wins and 8 losses and qualified for the playoffs. Matt Germain lead the team in scoring (17 goals, 8 assists) and goalkeeper Jason Jacob was fourth in the league with a 6.77 goals against average. The Magic defeated the Louisville Lightning in the Divisional Playoffs 9-5 in Louisville. They lost to the eventual PASL Champion San Diego Sockers 9-5 in the Newman Cup Semi-Finals in San Diego.

The team disbanded after the season.

Year-by-year

References

Defunct soccer clubs in Kansas
Culture of Overland Park, Kansas
Defunct Professional Arena Soccer League teams
Defunct indoor soccer clubs in the United States
2011 establishments in Kansas
2012 disestablishments in Kansas